Cours Sainte Marie de Hann is a school for different group of ages ranging from Kindergarten to high school in Dakar, Senegal. It was founded in 1949-1950 and belongs to a group of private schools in the Dakar Diocese of the Catholic Church.

In 1991 it was awarded the UNESCO Prize for Peace Education.

References

Educational institutions established in 1950
Schools in Senegal
Education in Dakar
1950 establishments in Senegal